This is a list of health trusts and hospitals in Norway:

Central Norway Regional Health Authority
Møre og Romsdal Hospital Trust
Kristiansund Hospital
Molde Hospital
Ålesund Hospital
Volda Hospital
Nord-Trøndelag Hospital Trust
Levanger Hospital
Namsos Hospital
St. Olavs Hospital Trust
St. Olavs University Hospital
Orkdal Hospital
Røros Hospital
Central Norway Pharmaceutical Trust
Northern Norway Regional Health Authority
Finnmark Hospital Trust
Hammerfest Hospital
Kirkenes Hospital
Helgeland Hospital Trust
Rana Hospital
Mosjøen Hospital
Sandnessjøen Hospital
Nordland Hospital Trust
Nordland Hospital, Bodø center 
Nordland Hospital, Lofoten (Vestvågøy)
Nordland Hospital, Vesterålen (Stokmarknes)
University Hospital of North Norway
Northern Norway Pharmaceutical Trust
Southern and Eastern Norway Regional Health Authority
Akershus University Hospital
Blefjell Hospital Trust
Notodden Hospital
Rjukan Hospital
Innlandet Hospital Trust
Elverum Hospital
Gjøvik Hospital
Granheim Lung Hospital
Hamar Hospital
Kongsvinger Hospital
Lillehammer Hospital
Tynset Hospital
Oslo University Hospital
Aker University Hospital
Rikshospitalet
Ullevål University Hospital
Psychiatry of Vestfold Hospital Trust
Sunnaas Hospital Trust
Southern Norway Hospital Trust
Sørlandet Hospital Arendal
Sørlandet Hospital Flekkefjord
Sørlandet Hospital Kristiansand
Telemark Hospital Trust
Skien Hospital
Vestfold Hospital Trust
Vestre Viken Hospital Trust
Bærum Hospital
Drammen Hospital
Kongsberg Hospital
Ringerike Hospital
Østfold Hospital Trust
Sykehuspartner
Southern and Eastern Norway Pharmaceutical Trust
Western Norway Regional Health Authority
Bergen Hospital Trust
Haukeland University Hospital
Voss Hospital
Kysthospitalet i Hagevik
Sandviken Hospital
Fonna Hospital Trust
Haugesund Hospital
Stord Hospital
Odda Hospital
Valen Hospital
Førde Hospital Trust
Førde Hospital
Nordfjord Hospital
Lærdal Hospital
Local Hospital at Florø
Stavanger Hospital Trust
Stavanger University Hospital
Western Norway Pharmaceutical Trust

Private hospitals
Skogli Health And Rehabilitation Center
Privatsykehuset Haugesund

References

 
Norway
Hospitals
Norway